Eleazar is a common Hebrew name. It may refer to:

People
Eleazar (name), list of people with this name

Eleazar, son of Aaron and second Kohen Gadol (High Priest) of Israel
Eleazar (son of Aminadab), who was entrusted as a keeper of the Ark of the Covenant
Eleazar (son of Dodo), one of King David's warriors
Eleazar (son of Pinhas), one of those in charge of the sacred vessels brought back to Jerusalem after the Babylonian Exile
Eleazar Avaran, the younger brother of Judas Maccabeus
Eleazar (2 Maccabees), a martyr described in 2 Maccabees 6
Eleazar, name chosen by Bodo (deacon) upon conversion to Judaism

Places
Elazar, Gush Etzion, a small Israeli settlement in the West Bank near the site of Eleazar Maccabeus' fatal battle

See also
Eliezer
Elessar
Lazar (disambiguation)
Lazarus (disambiguation)